The cinema of Iquitos, also known as Amazonian cinema, is an important film development and one of the historic pioneering event of cinema of Peru. Due to the rubber boom and the arrival of foreigners, film interest began in the early 20th century, along with the evolution of cinema of the United States in Hollywood. Cinema in Iquitos had no established date of origin.  The first film, however, was made in 1900. The first films were shown in the Casa de Fierro with an Edison machine, which reproduced the images using a carbide lamp and the constant movement of the operator. Iquitos is mentioned as a metonym of cinema in the Peruvian Amazon.

The most important pioneer of cinema in Iquitos and the Loreto Region is Antonio Wong Rengifo, also a pioneer of film art in Peru, with his most important work being Bajo el sol de Loreto. Alongside this, other filmmakers such as Werner Herzog, Armando Robles Godoy, Nora Izcue, Federico García, and Dorian Fernandez Moris prolonged the cinematic presence in the city.

History

Origins

Until around the 1880, Iquitos did not have a film set. Interest in film production grew alongside the film industry booming elsewhere in the world. There is not enough accurate visual record the exact birth of cinema in Iquitos. In 1890, following the rhythm of the European organization of the city, scientific technology began arriving.

The first film made in 1900 was recorded. A movie was projected for the first time in the Iron House with an Edison machine, which reproduced the images using a carbide lamp and the constant movement of an operator. Before the fact, in 1898, Clement Alcala and Francisco de Paula Secada obtained land on the north side of the Plaza de Armas, and built a rustic-roof building, naming it Alhambra. They installed a tiny carousel brought from Manaus, Brazil. In 1902, with the rubber boom and its international impact, Edward Fuller purchased Alhambra. It hence became the first movie theater in town with Lumière brand projectors.

In the continuous city growth following the success of the rubber extraction, and its connection with Europe, the bourgeoisie grew in the city. Arnaldo Reategui traveled to France in 1905, and bought a projector with a large collection of movies—in black-and-white and technicolor—from cinema house Pathé Freres and Léon Gaumont. He was affiliated with Luis Pinasco and built a cinema called Jardín Strassburgo, located on the first block of Sargento Lores street.  The first stage of Iquitos film concluded in 1914, with a prominent presence of French filmmakers. Georges Méliès and Gaumont sent several films on celluloid for the aristocratic film billboard of Iquitos. The film making attracted audiences, and blockbusters were reaching £4,500.

Rubber crisis and the prominence of Antonio Wong

Although the crisis hit Iquitos and had its effect on the industry, the arrival of new films did not stop. Films with a theatrical demeanor were gradually replaced by those more directed towards fiction. The filmmaking attracted new aspirations and acting talents, and the star system was present in the market.  The distribution of Charlie Chaplin silent films were introduced by the Spanish businessman Jose Altimira.

It is mainly known for shaping their ideologies, aspirations and other thoughts in his films. Wong Rengifo, in the course of his film making, followed the changing technology in the United States. In 1936, he premiered his film Bajo el sol de Loreto, a film which examines the main economic engine, and the valuation of the Peruvian Amazon (called "Selvak" in the film). He is thought to give an active representation of the amazonian culture in his films. Wong worked as a cameraman, developed his own films and edited them, and wrote his scripts inspired by Iquitos culture.

Developments to date
In October 1957, Wong started the production of a film, with Mexican actress Amalia Aguilar, to be shown at the First International Fair of Iquitos. Due to a fire, however, his film study was consumed by fire and never made it to cinemas. The same year, a group of filmmakers came from Hollywood, accompanied by Harma Lewis and Keith Larsen, to shoot 29 short films for the anthology Adventure in the Amazon, directed by Tom McGowan (a little-known, recherché filmmaker in database), and produced by Warner Bros. The series was eventually canceled due to transportation spending.

By the 1960s, film was representing the beauty and calm of the jungle, and Iquitos was home to most regional and international filmmakers. In the 1970s, the cinema of Iquitos was influenced by Decree Law Number 19327, entitled "Law for the Promotion of Film Industry." The decree facilitated the production of new films, and the presentation of the Amazon image.

The film went on to a more complex film language with themes about the richness of the jungle, the imperialist power, mining and resource processing, and use of the natives as a portrait of tourism. During these years, there were notable films such as No Stars in the Jungle (1966) and The Green Wall (1969) by Armando Robles Godoy; Aguirre, the Wrath of God (1972) and Fitzcarraldo (1982) by Werner Herzog; The Ayahuasca Wind (1983) by Nora Izcue and The Partner of God (1986) by Federico Garcia.  In 1990, Iquitos was gradually used as a stage for national and international soap operas; it was the backdrop for Anaconda (1997) by Luis Llosa; Captain Pantoja and the Special Services (2000) by Francisco Lombardi; The Motorcycle Diaries by Walter Salles and Daughters of Belén (2004) by Javier Corcuera.

In 2002, publicist Dorian Fernandez-Moris founded Audiovisual Films—founded as Audiovisual—and began with a team of twenty people. He began with short films like El otro lado, Runamula and 501, and subsequently made a series of workshops to increase interest in Iquitos cinephile. In 2006, he released Chullachaqui (based on an Amazon known legend), Immortal, and the film El último piso (18 February 2010). The latter was filmed at the tallest building in the city. In 2012, Audiovisual Films produced General Cemetery in Iquitos, and is scheduled for release in October 2012.

List of films

References 

Cinema of Peru
Iquitos